Butler College was a coeducational black school in Tyler, Texas. Established in 1905 by the East Texas Baptist Association, the school was originally called the East Texas Baptist Academy and was initially a combined elementary and high school. The school introduced college-level courses in the 1920s, and the name was changed to Butler College following the death of its first president, Reverend C. M. Butler, in 1924. During the Great Depression, the school sold partial ownership to the Texas Baptist Convention to gain financial support. After World War II, Butler became a four-year senior college. Enrollment declined during the 1960s, and the college closed in 1972.

References

Historically black schools
Education in Tyler, Texas
1905 establishments in Texas
Educational institutions established in 1905
Educational institutions disestablished in 1972
Defunct universities and colleges in Texas